The 1970–71 Swedish Division I season was the 27th season of Swedish Division I. Brynas IF won the league title by finishing first in the final round.

First round

Northern Group

Southern Group

Qualification round

Northern Group

Southern Group

Final round

External links
 1970–71 season

Swedish
Swedish Division I seasons
1